William Joseph Lowe (13 December 1901 – 1971) was an Irish sprinter. He competed in the men's 100 metres and the 200 metres events at the 1924 Summer Olympics.

References

External links
 

1901 births
1971 deaths
Irish male sprinters
Athletes (track and field) at the 1924 Summer Olympics
Olympic athletes of Ireland